John-Kymani Gordon (born 13 February 2003) is an English professional footballer who plays as a forward for  club Carlisle United on loan from  club Crystal Palace.

Early life 
Gordon joined Crystal Palace at the age of eight having been scouted playing locally in Purley, London for the youth team Purley Panthers FC. He was promoted to the Crystal Palace under-18 squad aged 15 years-old, whilst also representing England under-16s at this time.

Career

Crystal Palace 
Gordon signed his first professional contract with Crystal Palace in the summer of 2020, and signed a contract extension in December 2022. That month his performance for Crystal Palace against Trabzonspor in a friendly match reportedly impressed the scouts of their Turkish opponents. Gordon scored 11 times for the Crystal Palace reserve side in his first eight games of the 2022–23 developmental Premier
League 2 league season, and won the Premier League 2 Player of the Month award in September 2022.

Loan to Carlisle United 
In January 2023, Gordon joined Carlisle United F.C. on a 6-month loan after being an unused substitute for five Palace games and appearing three times for the development team in the EFL Trophy. Gordon made his senior professional debut on 14 January 2023 for Carlisle United, scoring the second goal of the game against Newport County in a 2-0 League Two home win at Brunton Park.

Career statistics

Club 
.

References

External links 

Living people
2003 births
English footballers
Footballers from Greater London
Crystal Palace F.C. players
Carlisle United F.C. players
English Football League players